Hoseyniyeh-ye Mashkur (also Romanized as Ḩoseynīyeh-ye Mashkūr) is a village in Azadeh Rural District, Moshrageh District, Ramshir County, Khuzestan Province, Iran. At the 2006 census, its population was 122, in 18 families.

References 

Populated places in Ramshir County